Single Collection/Yaiko's Selection is a CD/DVD Box Set release by Hitomi Yaida. It contains the albums Single Collection and Yaiko's Selection with an accompanying DVD. The DVD includes copies of her PV's and also a Yaiko Music History. Released in 2004, it peaked at No. 3 on the Japanese albums chart.

References

Hitomi Yaida albums
2004 compilation albums
2004 video albums
Music video compilation albums